Pristimantis marahuaka is a species of frog in the family Strabomantidae. It is endemic to the summit of Cerro Marahuaca, a tepui in central Amazonas state, Venezuela.
Its natural habitat is tepui shrubland at around  asl where it is common in the mossy bases of Heliamphora plants.

There are no direct threats to this species, but given its small range (<20 km2), it is considered "near threatened" by the International Union for Conservation of Nature.

References

marahuaka
Guayana Highlands
Vulnerable animals
Vulnerable biota of South America
Endemic fauna of Venezuela
Amphibians of Venezuela
Frogs of South America
Amphibians described in 2004
Taxonomy articles created by Polbot
Amphibians of the Tepuis